Lachapelle-aux-Pots is a commune in the Oise department in northern France.

Birthplace in 1874 of the poet, musician, painter, and art critic Léon Leclère (Tristan Klingsor).

See also
 Communes of the Oise department

References

Communes of Oise